The Centre for new media culture in Riga (RIXC) is the joint effort of a number of independent local Latvian cultural groups working in the fields of new media, art, film, music, youth culture and the social projects. The founders of RIXC are E-LAB (Electronic Arts and Media Centre), Locomotive (film studio and) Baltic Centre (NGO for education and social development).

The aim of the centre is to bridge the traditional gap between high and popular culture and the divisions between various youth, sub and minority cultures. RIXC intends to become a meeting place for different types of culture on local and international scale.

RIXC is the member of NICE network (Nordic, Baltic and North East European network) for small scale innovative initiatives in the field of new media culture, and takes part in other international and cross disciplinary networks, co-projects and mailing-lists in the field of new media culture in Europe, Canada and other parts of the world.

External links 
 RIXC
 NICE

European contemporary art
Latvian art